Oedipina parvipes, commonly known as the Colombian worm salamander, is a species of salamander in the family Plethodontidae. It is found in western Colombia and north-western Ecuador. Its type locality is Cáceres, Antioquia. It may occur further north to Panama and Costa Rica, but these records require confirmation as the species is morphologically indistinguishable from Costa Rican Oedipina uniformis.
Its natural habitat is humid lowland forest, wherein it lives in leaf-litter.

References

Oedipina
Amphibians of Colombia
Amphibians of Ecuador
Taxonomy articles created by Polbot
Amphibians described in 1879
Taxa named by Wilhelm Peters